Mario Berlinguer (Sassari, 29 August 1891 – Rome, 5 September 1969) was an Italian lawyer and politician. He descended from a noble Sardinian family of Catalan origins. As many of his ancestors, he belonged to the Italian Freemasonry and was Great Master (33rd Scottish Rite Mason) of the regular lodge of Sassari, affiliated to the Grand Orient of Italy.

Biography
Born in Sassari, in his youth he was a follower of the Meridionalist activist Gaetano Salvemini. After his graduation in law he collaborated with the newspaper La Nuova Sardegna and other Italian newspapers. 

He was elected to the Italian Chamber of Deputies in 1924. The following year he founded the clandestine newspaper Sardegna libera ("Free Sardinia") which attracted him the hostility of the Fascist regime. His sister, Ines, was among the anti-Fascist figures and was married to Stefano Siglienti. After the armistice with Italy (September 1943), he joined the Action Party. For the latter Berlinguer was a member of the second government formed by Pietro Badoglio in southern Italy.

In 1945 he was named to the Consulta Nazionale and collaborated to the elaboration of the special regional status for Sardinia. He was a deputy for PSI from 1948 to 1953.

He was the father of Giovanni and Enrico Berlinguer, outstanding members of the Italian Communist Party.

References

External links

1891 births
1969 deaths
People from Sassari
Italian people of Catalan descent
Action Party (Italy) politicians
Italian Socialist Party politicians
Deputies of Legislature XXVII of the Kingdom of Italy
Members of the National Council (Italy)
Senators of Legislature I of Italy
Deputies of Legislature II of Italy
Deputies of Legislature III of Italy
Deputies of Legislature IV of Italy
Politicians of Sardinia
20th-century Italian lawyers
Italian Aventinian secessionists